Pitso John Hamilton Mosimane (born 26 July 1964) is a South African professional football manager and a former player. He is the current manager of Saudi Arabian club Al-Ahli Jeddah. He is considered as one of the greatest coaches in Africa. He is the former coach of Mamelodi Sundowns, SuperSport United, and Al Ahly.

Born in Kagiso, Mosimane is one of the longest serving and most decorated coaches in all of South African football, having won multiple major trophies with SuperSport United between 2001 and 2007 and Mamelodi Sundowns between 2012 and 2020.

Club career
Mosimane started his senior career at Jomo Cosmos, then he played for Mamelodi Sundowns and Orlando Pirates, before joining Greek club Ionikos to play under coach Nikos Alefantos. He later joined Belgian team KFC Rita Berlaar and Qatari club Al Sadd.

Coaching career
Mosimane was an assistant coach to the under-11 players during his tenure with the Belgian club KFC Rita Berlaar, then he returned to South Africa to coach Mamelodi Sundowns reserves.

Supersport United
Mosimane joined Supersport United as an assistant coach to Bruce Grobbelaar, then he became the head coach from 2001 until 2007, where he finished second in 2001–02 and 2002–03 in the Premier Soccer League.

South Africa national team
Mosimane served as the caretaker coach of the South African national team, nicknamed as Bafana Bafana, for seven games in 2007, prior to the appointment of Carlos Alberto Parreira as head coach of the national team, whom Mosimane served as an assistant coach under during the 2010 FIFA World Cup. He also served as assistant to Joel Santana during the 2009 FIFA Confederations Cup, Parreira's successor and later predecessor.

On 15 July 2010, Mosimane was named as the new head coach of South Africa and was handed a four-year contract. He won his first game in charge in a 1–0 win over World Cup quarter-finalists Ghana. South Africa failed to qualify for the 2012 African Cup of Nations after Mosimane mistakenly played for a draw in the final qualifier against Sierra Leone, when in fact a victory was required.

Mamelodi Sundowns
In 2012, Mosimane became the manager of Mamelodi Sundowns. He won the 2016 CAF Champions League with Mamelodi Sundowns after defeating Egypt's Zamalek 3–1 on aggregate, making them the 2nd South African side to win it after Orlando Pirates in 1995.

In December 2016, Mosimane was ranked as the 10th best coach in the world for 2016, according to the International Federation of Football History and Statistics (IFFHS).

On 5 January 2017, Mosimane won the Coach of the Year accolade at the 2016 Glo-CAF awards in Abuja, Nigeria after guiding Mamelodi Sundowns to league glory in 2015–16 and claiming the Telkom Knockout trophy which meant Mosimane stood alone as the only coach to have made a clean sweep of all domestic trophies in the PSL era.

On 6 April 2019, Mosimane led his team Mamelodi Sundowns to a 5–0 win against Egyptian club Al Ahly in the 2018–19 CAF Champions League quarter-finals, in which he won 5–1 on aggregate to reach the semi-finals.

Mosimane is generally regarded as the most successful manager in South African football history, winning five ABSA Premiership titles with Mamelodi Sundowns. In late September 2020, Mosimane resigned as Mamelodi Sundowns coach.

Al Ahly
On 30 September 2020, Mosimane was announced to be the head coach of Al Ahly. He was the first non-Egyptian African to manage the club.

On 27 November 2020, Mosimane led Al Ahly to their 9th CAF Champions league title, after winning the 2020 final against their rivals Zamalek, and to qualify to the 2020 FIFA Club World Cup, where they eventually finished in third place after beating Palmeiras on penalties. On 6 December 2020, he led Al Ahly to win the Egyptian Cup. In May 2021, he guided the football club to win the African Super Cup against RS Berkane in Doha, Qatar.

On 17 July 2021, Al Ahly won their second CAF Champions league title under Mosimane and their 10th in total after a 3–0 win over Kaizer Chiefs in the final. Rory Smith argued that this eight-month tenure, in which Al Ahly won three trophies, made Mosimane one of the best managers in world football for the year. In December 2021, he won another African Super Cup in Qatar against Raja Casablanca. On 13 June 2022, Al Ahly accepted Mosimane's request to step down as their manager.

Al-Ahli Jeddah
On 25 September 2022, Mosimane was appointed as manager of Saudi Arabian club Al-Ahli Jeddah.

Career statistics

International

Managerial statistics

Honours and achievements

Player
Ionikos
 Beta Ethniki: 1993–94

Manager
Supersport United
 Nedbank Cup: 2005
 SAA Super Eight Cup: 2004

Mamelodi Sundowns
 Premier Soccer League: 2013–14, 2015–16, 2017–18, 2018–19, 2019–20
 Nedbank Cup: 2014–15, 2019–20
 Telkom Knockout: 2015, 2019
 CAF Champions League: 2016
 CAF Super Cup: 2017

Al Ahly
 CAF Champions League: 2019–20, 2020–21
 CAF Super Cup: 2021 (May), 2021 (Dec)
 Egypt Cup: 2019–20
 FIFA Club World Cup third-Place: 2020, 2021

Individual
 PSL Coach of the Season: 2013–14, 2015–16, 2017–18, 2018–19, 2019–20
 CAF Coach of the Year: 2016

References

External links
Website

1964 births
Living people
People from Gauteng
South African soccer managers
South African soccer players
South African expatriate soccer players
South Africa international soccer players
Jomo Cosmos F.C. players
Mamelodi Sundowns F.C. players
Ionikos F.C. players
Super League Greece players
Expatriate footballers in Greece
South African expatriate sportspeople in Greece
Al Sadd SC players
Qatar Stars League players
Expatriate footballers in Qatar
South African expatriate sportspeople in Qatar
South Africa national soccer team managers
Mamelodi Sundowns F.C. managers
SuperSport United F.C. managers
Association football midfielders
Al Ahly SC managers
Al-Ahli Saudi FC managers
Saudi First Division League managers
Expatriate football managers in Egypt
Expatriate football managers in Saudi Arabia
South African expatriate sportspeople in Saudi Arabia